Neha Saxena may refer to:
 Neha Saxena (film actress) (born 1989), Indian film actress
 Neha Saxena (TV actress), Indian television actress